Majhgain is a village in Chand block of Kaimur district, Bihar, India. As of 2011, its population was 243, in 38 households.

References 

Villages in Kaimur district